"To Die For" is a song released by Luke Galliana, who entered it into the United Kingdom selection for the Eurovision Song Contest 2001. The song made the final eight, but failed to gain the votes of the BBC Radio 2 audience on Friday morning. The single was released on 30 April 2001, and entered the UK chart at number 42.

The song became a huge hit on The Box TV channel. The single was produced by Pete Waterman. It was described by Peter Robinson in the NME as "a single which appears to have no chorus, virtually no tune and not a hint of sex to be found anywhere".

In 2006, "To Die For" was covered by Katie Price and Peter Andre on their album A Whole New World.

Track listing
Track 4 is an enhanced video included on the CD.

Personnel
Engineering – Mark "Ridders" Risdale
Mixing – Matt Howe
Producers – Topham, Twigg & Waterman

References

2001 singles
Songs written by Wayne Hector
Songs written by Stephen Lipson
Songs written by Deni Lew
Songs written by Nicky Graham
2001 songs
Jive Records singles